Edward Iordănescu (born 16 June 1978), sometimes known as Iordănescu Jr., is a Romanian former footballer who played as a midfielder, and the current manager of the Romania national team.

He represented nine teams during a rather uneventful playing career, of which Panionios and Alki Larnaca abroad. Like his father Anghel, he started both his playing and coaching career at Steaua București.

Iordănescu has found more success after his retirement as a player, earning a reputation in his country of being a studious manager who prepares matches in great detail. During his two stints at CFR Cluj he guided the team to three domestic trophies, and in 2022 was appointed at the helm of the Romania national team.

Playing career
Iordănescu's connection with Steaua București began in early 1984, at the age of six. His father Anghel Iordănescu, who was an assistant coach at the time, took him along with him to attend games on the Ghencea Stadium. He sat next to Alin Stoica, also the son of a club legend, and they began playing together during warm ups and half-time breaks. After playing for Steaua's youth teams, Iordănescu was promoted to the first team in 1996 along with Stoica.

He failed to impose himself at the Roș-albaștrii and left for Sportul Studențesc in 1997. Iordănescu spent the rest of his career with several teams in Romania—Unirea Focșani, Rapid București, Rocar București, Petrolul Ploiești and Vaslui. He also had spells abroad in Greece and Cyprus with Panionios and Alki Larnaca, respectively.

Managerial career
Iordănescu retired from playing football in 2004, in order to begin his managerial studies. He took courses in Italy, Spain and England. In 2010, after Ilie Dumitrescu announced his resignation from his role as Steaua București manager, Iordănescu took over as interim coach.

On 20 June 2013, Iordănescu signed a contract with Liga II side ASA Târgu Mureș with the clear target to promote to Liga I. In October 2013, he resigned. In December 2014, Iordănescu was named head coach of Pandurii Târgu Jiu. He guided his side to the final of the 2014–15 Cupa Ligii competition. On 24 August 2016, Iordănescu was unveiled as the new head coach of Bulgarian club CSKA Sofia. Polish side Lech Poznań were also interested in hiring Iordănescu. On 27 November 2016, following a 1–1 home draw against Vereya, he resigned from his duties.

On 8 June 2017, he was appointed manager of Liga I club Astra Giurgiu. On 2 April 2018, his contract with the club was terminated after a mutual agreement. On 13 June 2018, Iordănescu signed a three-year deal with CFR Cluj, replacing Dan Petrescu who left for Guizhou Hengfeng. He won his first trophy as a manager on 15 July, as his new side defeated Universitatea Craiova 1–0 in the Supercupa României.

On 12 September 2021, Iordănescu coaching FCSB, managed the biggest score victory in the history of the Eternal derby, 6–0.

On 25 January 2022, Iordănescu was appointed as the new manager of the Romania national football team.

Personal life
Iordănescu dated Romanian singer-songwriter Delia Matache from 2005 to 2006. He is now married to a woman with whom he has three children.

Career statistics

Managerial

Honours

Player
Steaua București
Divizia A: 1995–96
Cupa României: 1995–96

Petrolul Ploiești
Divizia B: 2002–03

Manager
Pandurii Târgu Jiu
Cupa Ligii runner-up: 2014–15

CFR Cluj
Liga I: 2018–19, 2020–21
Supercupa României: 2018, 2020

Individual
Gala Fotbalului Românesc Romanian Coach of the Year: 2021

References

External links

1978 births
Living people
Footballers from Bucharest
Romanian footballers
FC Steaua București players
FC Sportul Studențesc București players
FC Rapid București players
CSM Focșani players
FC Petrolul Ploiești players
AFC Rocar București players
FC Vaslui players
Panionios F.C. players
Alki Larnaca FC players
Liga I players
Super League Greece players
Cypriot First Division players
Romanian expatriate footballers
Romanian expatriate sportspeople in Greece
Romanian expatriate sportspeople in Cyprus
Expatriate footballers in Greece
Expatriate footballers in Cyprus
Romanian football managers
FC Astra Giurgiu managers
CFR Cluj managers
FC Steaua București assistant managers
CS Pandurii Târgu Jiu managers
ASA 2013 Târgu Mureș managers
PFC CSKA Sofia managers
CS Gaz Metan Mediaș managers
FC Steaua București managers
Romania national football team managers
Romanian expatriate football managers
Expatriate football managers in Bulgaria
Romanian expatriate sportspeople in Bulgaria
Association football midfielders